Joncas River may refer to:

 Joncas River (Ferrée River tributary), in Chaudière-Appalaches, Quebec, Canada
 Joncas River (Harricana River tributary), a stream in Ontario, and Quebec Canada